South Range Local School District, home of the Raiders, serves students of Beaver and Green Townships in Mahoning County, Ohio, United States. South Range Local School District is made up of one K-12 building.  The school district's homepage is http://www.southrange.k12.oh.us/

School districts in Ohio
Education in Mahoning County, Ohio